Seven Seas Navigator is a luxury cruise ship operated by Regent Seven Seas Cruises.  She entered service for Radisson Seven Seas Cruises in 1999.  Ninety percent of her cabins have their own private verandas. She has no sister ships. The hull was constructed by former USSR (Russia) as a satellite tracking ship. The hull was purchased by RSSC and the superstructure was finished by Mariotti Yards, Italy.

History
In 2004, the ship was featured and used as a focal point for the movie After the Sunset. The movie starred Pierce Brosnan and Salma Hayek.

In the spring of 2006, Radisson Seven Seas Cruises re-branded as Regent Seven Seas Cruises. The Seven Seas Navigator continues to sail under the brand Regent Seven Seas Cruises.

The Navigator underwent a $40 million refurbishment in March/April 2016 that upgraded the common areas and suites.

USN Captain (retired) Morton Jablin has lived on Seven Seas Navigator since 2005.

Incidents 

During the coronavirus pandemic, on 2020.05.21, it was reported that a female crew member aboard Seven Seas Navigator had tested positive for SARS-CoV-2, and that a second crew member was also showing symptoms of the virus.  The ship had subsequently requested entry to the Port of Barcelona, and the Ministry of Health granted them an exception to do so.  After docking, both sick crew members were given serological tests, and both returned positive.  Both crew members were been isolated, and the rest of the roughly 450 crew members of the ship were placed under quarantine.

Notes

References

External links
Official website

Cruise ships
1991 ships
Ships built by T. Mariotti
Ships built in Genoa